The 2017–18 Israeli Basketball National League (or the Liga Leumit) is the 18th season of the Israeli Basketball National League. It started on October 15, 2017 with the first round of the regular season and ended on May 22, 2018 with the finals. Hapoel Be'er Sheva have won the championship after defeating Maccabi Kiryat Gat 3–0 in a best of five series.

Teams
The following teams had changed divisions after the 2016–17 season:

Relegated from Premier League
Maccabi Kiryat Gat

Promoted from Liga Artzit
Maccabi Kiryat Motzkin
Elitzur Yavne

Venues and locations

League table

Regular season

Playouts

Playoffs

Statistical leaders

|  style="width:50%; vertical-align:top;"|

Assists

|}
|}

|  style="width:50%; vertical-align:top;"|

Efficiency

|}
|}

Other statistics

Source: ibasketball.co.il

Awards

Finals MVP

Regular Season MVP

Coach of the Year

All-League First Team

Source: EuroBasket.com

See also
2017–18 Israeli Basketball Premier League
2017–18 Israeli Basketball State Cup

References

Israeli
Basketball